Sir Robert Paul Reid (born 1 May 1934) was Chairman of the British Railways Board from 1990 until 1995.

Early life
Reid was educated at the University of St Andrews and has a graduate degree from European Business School London.

Career
He joined Shell in 1956, ending his time there as Chief Executive from 1985 to 1990. Since his time on the railways he has been Chairman of the International Petroleum Exchange, Deputy Governor of the Bank of Scotland, Chief Executive of Sears and Chancellor of Robert Gordon University

Chairman of British Rail

He became Chairman of the British Railways Board in 1990 taking over from Sir Robert Reid (no relation), a position he held until 1995, by which time the Privatisation of British Rail had already begun.

Notes

1934 births
Living people
British Rail people
Alumni of the University of St Andrews
People from Cupar
People associated with Robert Gordon University
Knights Bachelor
Scottish knights
Businesspeople awarded knighthoods
Shell plc people
Sears Holdings people
Alumni of European Business School London